Platismatia stenophylla is a species of corticolous (bark-dwelling), foliose lichen in the family Parmeliaceae. It is found in western North America, from Vancouver Island south to central California, usually close to a shore. It was first formally described as a species of Cetrelia in 1882 by American lichenologist Edward Tuckerman. William and Chicita Culberson transferred it to the genus Platismatia in 1968. The lichen is distinguished from others in its genus by its narrow, linear lobes. It contains caperatic acid and atranorin as lichen products.

References

Parmeliaceae
Lichen species
Lichens described in 1882
Lichens of Canada
Lichens of the Northwestern United States
Lichens of the Southwestern United States
Taxa named by Edward Tuckerman